Orthophytum benzingii is a plant species in the genus Orthophytum.

The bromeliad is endemic to the Atlantic Forest biome (Mata Atlantica Brasileira) within Minas Gerais, located in southeastern Brazil.

References

benzingii
Endemic flora of Brazil
Flora of Minas Gerais
Flora of the Atlantic Forest
Critically endangered plants
Critically endangered biota of South America